The origin of most of the lakes in the Philippines is closely related to volcanic and tectonic activity. A number of smaller lakes occupy the craters of extinct volcanoes.  Some lake basins are developed by subsidence due to tectonic or volcanic activity.  Others owe their existence to obstruction of drainage courses by landslides, lava flows and by fragmental volcanic ejecta.

Among the lakes which are known in the Philippines only three, namely, Laguna de Bay in Luzon, Taal Lake in Luzon, and Lake Lanao in Mindanao, stand out prominently because of their size or economic importance.

List
The following is a partial alphabetical listing of permanent lakes (excluding flood plains) in the Philippines.

Gallery

Largest and deepest lakes

See also

Geography of the Philippines
Outline of the Philippines

References

Lakes

Philippines
Lakes